Valentin Courrent (born August 16, 1982 in Bondy) is a French rugby union player for FC Grenoble in the Top 14 competition. He plays as a fly-half. He has won both the Guinness Premiership and the Top 14, and was the first player to achieve this feat. In the 2005–2006 season, Courrent played as a replacement and scored a conversion in the final as Sale Sharks won their first ever Premiership title.

Honours
Sale Sharks
Guinness Premiership (2006)
Stade Toulousain
Top 14 (2008)

References

External links
Toulouse profile

1982 births
Living people
French rugby union players
Stade Toulousain players
Rugby union scrum-halves
Sale Sharks players